Palatial mosque in Baku is a mosque of the 15th century, which is included in Shirvanshah's palace complex in Baku.

Architecture
The plan of the mosque is rectangular. There is a small hall, small prayer room for women, and serving rooms. The northern portal, turned towards a burial vault of Shirvanshahs, is more solemn than the eastern one. The latter, which came down to an underground exit, was intended for the inhabitants of the palace.

Interior
Two tier windowed prayer room is covered with cupola with spherical sails. Mihrab is located in the southern end of the palace. Cupola area over one a tier women prayer room ceding to cupola of the hall with its dimensions and replacing its outlines. Aperture of the mosque's portal is clearly described on severe background of prismatic volume, ended with two cupolas with slightly sharpening calottes.

Minaret
Trunk of the minaret is surrounded by an inscription, a ligature of which has a date of 845 (1441/42). Details of sherefe's stalactites are subtly modeled.

Gallery

References

World Heritage Sites in Azerbaijan
1442 establishments in Asia
Mosques in Baku
1440s in the Middle East
Palace of the Shirvanshahs